James Turner (c. 1852 – 12 October 1899) was a British architect based in Matlock.

History
He was born in New Mills, Derbyshire around 1852, the son of Thomas B Turner and Mary. With his wife Elizabeth, he had 5 sons:
Thomas B Turner (1877-1888)
James Parson Turner (b. 1879)
Joseph Turner (1881-1957)
Frederick Turner (1883-1963)
John Edward Turner (b. 1885)
Samuel William Turner (b. 1888)

Until 1893 he was in partnership with George Robert Hall in Matlock as Architects, Surveyors and Estate Agents, as Turner and Hall.

He died on 12 October 1899 and left an estate valued at £159 14s.

Works
Day Schools, Tansley, Derbyshire 1889 enlargement
Co-operative Store, Matlock Bank Industrial and Provident Society, Smedley Street, Matlock 1891
Church Schools, South Darley, Derbyshire 1892 Enlargement
Depot for Matlock Cable Tramway 1893
Bank House Hydro, Matlock 1894
Pavilion, Swimming Bath and Gardens, Matlock 1894-95
Matlock Board School, School Road, Matlock Bank 1897

References

19th-century English architects
People from New Mills
1899 deaths
Architects from Derbyshire
Year of birth uncertain